Shri Guru Ram Rai Institute of Medical & Health Sciences  is a private medical college located in Patelnagar in Dehradun district, Uttarakhand, India. The medical college hospital was started in April 2002 and the college received permission for MBBS admission in 2006 and Postgraduate courses started in 2011. It was affiliated to Hemwati Nandan Bahuguna Uttarakhand Medical Education University. It has an annual intake of 150 for  MBBS seats and 97 Post graduate seats in various specialties recognized by MCI. In 2017 it became a constituent college of Shri Guru Ram Rai University.

History 
The institute was started as a part of the Shri Guru Ram Rai education mission and was propelled to success by the present Sajjada Nashin Sri Mahant Devendra Das Ji, the successor of the highest seat of Udaseen Sect. He dedicated this institution to the name of Sri Guru Ram Rai ji Maharaj, the eldest son of the seventh Guru of the Sikhs- Sri Har Rai ji. Shri Guru Ram Rai Ji established his DERA in Doon valley which later became popular as DEHRA and thus Dehradun owes its name and history to the emergence of Sri Guru Ram Rai ji's "Dera" in 1676 hence it is now called Dehradun.

Location 
The institute is located in the middle of Dehradun, capital of Uttarakhand state in the northern part of India and is nearly two kilometres away from the railway station and the interstate bus terminal and 28 kilometres away from the airport. It is surrounded by the Himalayan mountain ranges and is 26 kilometres away from the famous hill station Mussoorie, 44 kilometres away from Rishikesh which is a famous city for Yoga retreats and 52 kilometres from Haridwar which is a city famous for the holy river Ganges.

College 
The medical college is spread over 30 acres and is equipped with Lecture theaters, molecular research laboratory, central library, auditorium, animal home, museums and dissection hall which are all fitted with modern equipment. All departments have computer facilities including a campus wide LAN internet system. Students are provided with hostel and mess facilities and other on campus facilities like laundry, football and cricket ground, badminton court, basketball court, volleyball ground, parking facilities, canteen and cafeteria. It also has a variety of restaurants, local eateries, super markets, grocery stores, salons, gymnasiums, hotels, petrol pumps in very close proximity to the campus. Apart from academics yearly sports and cultural activities are held to encourage all round development of students.

Hospital 
The medical college is associated with Shri mahant Indresh hospital (SMIH) located in Patelnagar in Dehradun district, Uttarakhand. It is a 1500 bedded multi-specialty and super specialty teaching hospital with a staff of 400+ doctors including faculty members and 800+ paramedicals in various departments which caters to about 3000 patients on a daily basis and is equipped with NABL accredited laboratories with latest and modern equipment, ICU's, 17 OT complex, latest MRI, 3D CT, Digital X-rays, ventilators, burn unit, dialysis unit, medical retina unit with laser treatment, neurology and urology units and 24 hour trauma and emergency services. Students are posted in rotation in all the departments during their training as well as internship to gain experience. Students are also posted in both rural and urban health training centers to provide community health services.

References

Private medical colleges in India
Medical colleges in Uttarakhand
Education in Dehradun district
Educational institutions established in 2006
2006 establishments in Uttarakhand